Boyle County High School is a public high school located in Danville, Kentucky, United States. It serves nearly 900 students in grades 9–12. The school opened to students in the 1963–1964 school year. The school was created to merge the area's high school students into one school. Students came from four county schools that served grades 1–12 in the same building.  Additionally, eighth graders from East End Elementary (grades 1–8) became part of the new high school.

Students

The makeup of the student body is 53.1% male and 46.9% female.  43.7% of students are eligible for the free or reduced-price lunch program. The student-teacher ratio is 16:1.

Boyle County was ranked top 15 among the 2017–18 Kentucky Department of Education student assessment at grade levels for students’ math and reading scores. It has been ranked among the top 50 in the state for “transition readiness” from middle school to college. It was ranked in the top 40 high schools for its “graduation rate” scores. It also excelled in ACT scores and advanced AP courses. The high school averaged a composite ACT score of 22 and 19 percent of the senior class scored a 28 or higher.

Activities
Boyle County competes in the several interscholastic sports as the Rebels (boys) and Lady Rebels (girls). The school has rivalries with neighboring schools Danville High School and Lincoln County High School.

Football

Boyle County has been Kentucky High School Athletic Association State Champion in football thirteen times. In 2009, Boyle County won their sixth title by rallying from a 22-7 to beat Lone Oak 42-39 in double overtime.

The 2017 championship was their first since 2010; they won 40-21 over Corbin. They were state runner-up in 2004 with a 13-2 record and then lost 22-6 to Highlands. As of 2014, their head coach is Chuck Smith. He was rehired after being Boyle County's head coach from 1992 to 2004. The team was also coached by Larry French; he started in 2008 and left for Southwestern High School in 2013. ShaDon Brown, recently hired as safeties coach for the Louisville Cardinals, served as an assistant coach for the team's 2007 season.

Boys Soccer

Boys Basketball

Marching band
Under the direction of Tim Blevins, Boyle County has produced three state championship marching bands. The Marching Rebels were crowned the Kentucky Music Educators Association (KMEA) Class A State Champions in 2001, 2002, and 2003. KMEA classes are assigned based on enrollment at participating high school. The Marching Rebels were state finalists in 1996, 2004 (A), 2005 (AAA), 2006 (AAA), 2007 (AAA), 2008 (AAAA), 2009 (AAA), and 2010 (AAA).

Notable alumni
 Neal Brown – college football coach; former offensive coordinator at Texas Tech, Kentucky, current head coach West Virginia University.
 Travis Leffew – University of Louisville player, professional football player, and former Lincoln County head coach.
 Jacob Tamme – Indianapolis Colts, Denver Broncos, and Atlanta Falcons football player.

References

External links
 
 Boyle County School District

Buildings and structures in Danville, Kentucky
Schools in Boyle County, Kentucky
Public high schools in Kentucky
Educational institutions established in 1963
1963 establishments in Kentucky